Cork North or North Cork may refer to:

 North Cork (UK Parliament constituency), 1885–1922
 Cork North (Dáil constituency), 1923–1969
 Cork North Infirmary, established 1744